Hoplistonychus bondari is a species of beetle in the family Cerambycidae, and the only species in the genus Hoplistonychus. It was described by Melzer in 1930.

References

Aerenicini
Beetles described in 1930
Monotypic beetle genera